The High Frontier Honor Guard is the official United States Air Force ceremonial unit assigned to Peterson Air Force Base in Colorado Springs, Colorado. It is the de facto official honor guard unit for the United States Space Force. It renders honors to local officials and veterans during ceremonies and parades. In conducting its duties, it has an area of responsibility that consists of the most counties in Colorado and 8 in the western part of neighboring Kansas. Outside of Peterson AFB, it also recruits airman from Schriever Air Force Base at the request of their unit leadership. Bugles Across America is partnered with the honor guard to ensure a live bugler is present at events.

Creed 
The creed is as follows:

See also 

 Queen's Colour Squadron
 United States Air Force Honor Guard

Sources

External links 
 Peterson AFB Home Page
 High Frontier Honor Guard

United States Air Force
Ceremonial units of the United States military